Ruby Giant may refer to:

 a purple coneflower (Echinacea purpurea) cultivar
 an early crocus (Crocus tommasinianus) cultivar